Norwest is a suburb of the Hills District within Greater Western Sydney, in the state of New South Wales, Australia, located 35 kilometres north-west of the Sydney central business district. The Norwest Business Park is located within Norwest and the adjacent suburb of Bella Vista and Baulkham Hills. The council chambers for The Hills Shire Council are also located within this suburb.

History
Norwest was officially proclaimed a suburb on 29 June 2018.  Previously, it had been part of the older suburbs of Baulkham Hills and Kellyville.

The Geographical Names Board, in June 2018, amended the suburb boundaries of Kellyville, Baulkham Hills, Bella Vista and Rouse Hill resulting in the creation of two new suburbs named North Kellyville and Norwest.

Commercial areas
Norwest Marketplace is a shopping centre featuring a Coles and many specialty stores including McDonald's, Subway, Mad Mex, Oporto, Joey's Pizza & Pasta, small electronic and clothing stores, banks, restaurants and a day care centre.

Residential areas
Norwest features two main residential areas along boundaries of the suburb. Within Norwest, there is a variety of housing including low density housing, townhouses and apartments. Most of the housing within Norwest is close to retail, employment, recreation and transport within the suburb and the neighbouring suburbs of Kellyville, Castle Hill and Baulkham Hills. 

The area to the north of the suburb is part of the Balmoral Road release area and is within proximity of roads such as Fairway Drive, Stone Mason Drive and Spurway Drive. This area has a wide range from high rise apartments close to the lake to low density housing to the north of the golf course.

The area to the south of the suburb is located along Barina Downs Road and features mainly low density housing and townhouses, with one apartment complex

Transport

Road
Windsor Road connects Norwest to Baulkham Hills, Parramatta and Sydney from the eastern end of the suburb. Within the suburb, Norwest Boulevard connects Norwest with Bella Vista, the Westlink M7 and Old Windsor Road, which connects Norwest with other locations such as Penrith, Liverpool and Campbelltown.

Metro

Norwest is serviced by Norwest Metro Station which is located on the Northwest line of the Sydney Metro. Opened in 2019, the station links Norwest to locations between Tallawong and Chatswood stations. The line will be extended by 2024 through the City and to Bankstown via the existing Bankstown railway line.

Buses
Norwest is serviced by multiple bus routes run by Hillsbus and Busways. These include:
613X Bella Vista to the City via M2 Motorway & Lane Cove Tunnel
632 Rouse Hill to Pennant Hills via Norwest and Castle Hill
660 Castlewood to Parramatta via T-Way
662 Castle Hill to Parramatta via Norwest, Bella Vista & the T-Way
664 Rouse Hill to Parramatta via Kellyville, Norwest, Bella Vista & the T-Way
714 Bella Vista to Seven Hills via Crestwood
715 Castle Hill to Seven Hills via Norwest and Bella Vista
730 Castle Hill to Blacktown via Norwest, Bella Vista, Glenwood & the T-Way

Places of worship
The Hillsong church is located within Norwest.

References

External links
Suburb Changes – North Kellyville, Norwest & Bella Vista - Hills Shire

Suburbs of Sydney
The Hills Shire
Populated places established in 2018
2018 establishments in Australia